The Barn Sessions is a studio album by American reggae rock band State Radio. It consists mostly of reworkings of songs from their previous record, Us Against the Crown,  plus two previously unreleased tracks.

Track listing
 State I and I (State Inspector) – 4:18
 Black Cab Motorcade – 3:50
 People to People – 4:41
 Olli Olli – 3:44
 Calvados Chopper – 6:42
 Right Me Up – 6:16
 Rushian – 2:46
 Camilo – 7:17
 Diner Song – 4:09
 Give You All My Time to Save – 3:28

References

State Radio albums
2007 albums